Sutjeska is an urban neighborhood of Belgrade, the capital of Serbia. It is located in Belgrade's municipality of Zemun.

Location
Sutjeska is located west of the old core of Zemun. It is bordered by the neighborhoods of Sava Kovačević on the west (bounded by the Šilerova street), Gornji Grad on the north (Ugrinovačka street), Novi Grad's sub-neighborhood of Vojni Put I on the south-west (Pazovački put), while Prvomajska street marks the southern border of the neighborhood.

Characteristics
The neighborhood is predominantly residential, with 7,446 inhabitants by the 2002 census of population. It has its own ambulance and elementary school.

It was named after the Battle of Sutjeska which took place in 1943 between Partisans and the Axis forces, where Partisan leader Sava Kovačević  was killed. Back-to-back neighborhoods of Blok Sutjeska and Blok Sava Kovačević also exist in another Belgrade's neighborhood, Krnjača, in the municipality of Palilula.

Neighborhoods

Bački Ilovik
North-west extension. It is a triangularly shaped and bounded by the streets of Bačka on the east, Ugrinovačka on the north and Pazovački put on the south, it is mostly inhabited by the Romani people. Several companies for collecting old materials (iron, aluminium, paper, etc.) are located in the neighborhood.

Meandri
North-east, residential extension, bounded by the streets of Zagorska on the south, Rade Končara on the east and Ugrinovačka on the north. The name means meanders.

Zemun Bačka
Zemun Bačka is the northernmost extension of the neighborhood and unlike the rest of Sutjeska, mostly industrial area. In the north it extends in the direction of Nova Galenika while the neighborhood of Altina begins just west, across the Belgrade-Novi Sad highway. A roundabout of the bus lines 18 and 83, which connect Zemun with downtown Belgrade is located in the neighborhood.

References

External links

Neighborhoods of Belgrade